Giscard d'Estaing is a French surname. Notable people with the surname include:
*Anne-Aymone Giscard d'Estaing (born 1933), former First Lady of France
Aurore Giscard d'Estaing, illustrator and wife of Timothy Hutton
Guillaume Giscard d'Estaing (born 1958), French businessman
Henri Giscard d'Estaing (born 1956), French businessman
Louis Giscard d'Estaing (born 1958), French politician
Olivier Giscard d'Estaing (1927–2021), French politician
Valéry Giscard d'Estaing (1926–2020), President of France (1974–1981)

See also

d'Estaing

French-language surnames
Compound surnames